Madalline is an unincorporated community in Union Township, Parke County, in the U.S. state of Indiana.

History
A post office was established under the name Medelline in 1852, and remained in operation until it was discontinued in 1862.

Geography

References

Unincorporated communities in Parke County, Indiana
Unincorporated communities in Indiana
1852 establishments in Indiana
Populated places established in 1852